Enrique Antonio Degenhart Asturias was Guatemala's Minister of the Interior.

Biografía 

Bachiller.

References

Living people
Government ministers of Guatemala
Year of birth missing (living people)
Unionist Party (Guatemala) politicians